This article contains information about the literary events and publications of 1823.

Events
February 7 – The Bannatyne Club is inaugurated by Sir Walter Scott and others as a text publication society to print by subscription rare texts on the history, literature and traditions of Scotland.
October – Thomas De Quincey's classic essay "On the Knocking at the Gate in Macbeth" appears in this month's issue of The London Magazine.
May 23 – Russian writer Alexander Pushkin begins work on his verse novel Eugene Onegin.
December – Samuel Taylor Coleridge, suffering from opium addiction, moves to No. 3, The Grove, Highgate, a house owned by Dr James Gillman. 
December 15 – John Neal sails for England where he became the first American author published in British literary journals.
December 23 – Clement Clarke Moore's poem, A Visit from St. Nicholas is published anonymously in the Troy, New York, Sentinel, and introduces the eponym "Santa Claus".
Unknown dates
Discovery of the 1603 First Quarto edition of William Shakespeare's Hamlet (a so-called "bad quarto"), by Sir Henry Bunbury, causes scholarly excitement.
London actor Edmund Kean reinstates in performance the original, tragic ending of Shakespeare's play King Lear, not generally used since 1681, although it is not well received.
The London publisher C. Baldwyn brings out the first English translation of Grimms' Fairy Tales as German Popular Stories. Translated from the Kinder und Haus Märchen collected by MM. Grimm from Oral Tradition. The anonymous translations were made by two lawyers, Edgar Taylor and David Jardine, and the illustrations by George Cruikshank, who is beginning to focus on this medium.

New books

Fiction
Willibald Alexis – Walladmor
James Fenimore Cooper – The Pioneers
Claire de Duras – Ourika
John Galt
The Entail, or The Lairds of Grippy
The Gathering of the West
Ringan Gilhaize, or The Covenanters
The Spaewife: a tale of the Scottish chronicles
Thomas Gaspey – Monks of Leadenhead
Sarah Green – The Nieces
Jane Harvey – Mountalyth
William Hazlitt – Liber Amoris
Victor Hugo – Han d'Islande
Grace Kennedy – Father Clement
Caroline Lamb – Ada Reis
John Gibson Lockhart – Reginald Dalton
Mary Meeke – What Shall Be, Shall Be
John Neal
Logan, a Family History (London edition)
Seventy-Six
Randolph, A Novel
Errata; or, the Works of Will. Adams
James Kirke Paulding – Koningsmarke, the Long Finne
Sir Walter Scott (anonymously)
Peveril of the Peak
Quentin Durward
St. Ronan's Well
Mary Shelley – Valperga
John Wilson – The Trials of Margaret Lyndsay
Anonymous – Popular Tales and Romances of the Northern Nations

Short stories
Ernst Raupach – "Wake Not the Dead"

Children and young people
Mrs Markham (Elizabeth Penrose) – A History of England from the First Invasion by the Romans to the End of the Reign of George III

Drama
Aleksander Griboyedov – Woe from Wit («Горе от ума», written)
Franz Grillparzer – König Ottokars Glück und Ende (The Fortune and Fall of King Ottokar, published)
 Felicia Hemans – The Vespers of Palermo
Mary Russell Mitford – Julian
Richard Brinsley Peake – Presumption; or, the Fate of Frankenstein
 James Planché – Cortez
Eugène Scribe 
L'Héritière (The Heiress, for the Théâtre du Gymnase)
Le Menteur Veridique (The Veritable Liar)
 William Tennant – Cardinal Beaton

Poetry
Thomas Campbell – The Last Man
Alphonse de Lamartine – Nouvelles méditations poétiques
Adam Mickiewicz – Grażyna
Henry Neele – Poems, Dramatic and Miscellaneous
Percy Bysshe Shelley – Posthumous Poems

Non-fiction
Alexandre Bertrand – Traité du somnambulisme
William Buckland – Reliquiæ Diluvianæ, or, Observations on the Organic Remains attesting the Action of a Universal Deluge
Lorenzo Da Ponte – Memorie
Emmanuel, comte de Las Cases – Le Mémorial de Sainte-Hélène
John Franklin – Narrative of a Journey to the Shores of the Polar Sea
Ethan Smith – View of the Hebrews

Births
January 1 – Sándor Petőfi, Hungarian poet and revolutionary (died 1849)
February 28 – Ernest Renan, French philosopher and writer (died 1892)
March 20 – Ned Buntline (E. Z. C. Judson), American writer and publisher 1886)
April 6 – Julia Abigail Fletcher Carney, American poet, author, editor, and educator (died 1908)
April 12 – Alexander Ostrovsky, Russian dramatist (died 1886)	
April 19 – Anna Laetitia Waring, Welsh poet and hymnist (died 1910)
June 1 – Caroline Howard Jervey, American author, poet, and teacher (died 1877)
August 2 – Edward Augustus Freeman, English historian and politician (died 1892)
August 13 – Goldwin Smith, English historian and journalist (died 1910)
September 23 – Sara Jane Lippincott, American author, poet, correspondent, lecturer, and newspaper founder (died 1904)
September 27 – Augusta Harvey Worthen, American author and educator (died 1910)
October 6 – George Henry Boker, American poet, playwright and diplomat (died 1890)
December 28 – Augusta Theodosia Drane, English religious writer and biographer (died 1894)

Deaths
February 7 – Ann Radcliffe, English novelist (born 1764)
February 21 – Charles Wolfe, Irish poet (born 1791)
April 10 – Karl Leonhard Reinhold, Austrian philosopher (born 1757)
April 21 – Peter Collett, Danish judge and writer (born 1767)
May 16 – Ōta Nanpo, Japanese comic poet and painter (born 1749)
June 19 – William Combe, English writer, poet and adventurer (born 1742)
August 19 – Robert Bloomfield, English "ploughboy poet" (born 1766)
August 20 – Friedrich Arnold Brockhaus, German encyclopedia publisher and editor (born 1772)
September 11 – David Ricardo, English political economist (born 1772)
November 9 – Vasily Kapnist, Russian poet and dramatist (born 1758)

Awards
Chancellor's Gold Medal – Winthrop Mackworth Praed
Newdigate Prize – T. S. Salmon

References

 
Years of the 19th century in literature